Verkhniye Usly (Ürge Uśılı) is a rural locality (a selo) and the administrative centre of Uslinsky Selsoviet, Sterlitamaksky District, Bashkortostan, Russia. The population was 732 as of 2010. There are 8 streets.

Geography 
Verkhniye Usly is located 26 km northwest of Sterlitamak (the district's administrative centre) by road. Nizhniye Usly is the nearest rural locality.

References 

Rural localities in Sterlitamaksky District